Tromsdalen UIL is a Norwegian sports club founded in 1938, from Tromsdalen in the municipality of Tromsø. It has sections for football, athletics, skiing and gymnastics.

The men's football team plays in 2. divisjon, the third level in Norwegian football. Their home games are played at Tromsdalen Stadion, which seats 3,000 spectators.  Their colors are red and blue.

Football
The team was promoted to the 1. divisjon in 2003, but was relegated after one season. The club was reintroduced to the second highest flight of Norwegian football, which in the meantime had changed its name to Adeccoligaen, in 2005. After a poor start to the 2006 season, Tromsdalen was in the relegation zone for most of the season. But a very good ending of the season, beating many top clubs, Tromsdalen survived the drop and played in 1. divisjon in the 2007 season as well. However, they were relegated to 2. divisjon in 2007. The stay there wasn't long; Tromsdalen finished champion in Fourth Group of 2. divisjon in 2008 and returned to 1. divisjon for the 2009 season. After two seasons in 1. divisjon, Tromsdalen was relegated to the 2. divisjon.

In 2011, Tromsdalen scored 105 goals in the 2. divisjon, which is a Norwegian record, and again won promotion to the second tier.

In 2007 Tromsdalen's women's team played in the women's first division.

In the 2019 season, Tromsdalen has to play their home games at Alfheim Stadion because their floodlights were not approved by the Football Association of Norway.

Recent history
{|class="wikitable"
|-bgcolor="#efefef"
! Season
! 
! Pos.
! Pl.
! W
! D
! L
! GS
! GA
! P
!Cup
!Notes
|-
|2006
|1. divisjon
|align=right |12
|align=right|30||align=right|8||align=right|11||align=right|11
|align=right|48||align=right|52||align=right|35
|Second round
|
|-
|2007
|1. divisjon
|align=right bgcolor="#FFCCCC"| 14
|align=right|30||align=right|7||align=right|8||align=right|15
|align=right|37||align=right|56||align=right|29
|Third round
|Relegated to the 2. divisjon
|-
|2008
|2. divisjon
|align=right bgcolor=#DDFFDD| 1
|align=right|26||align=right|17||align=right|5||align=right|4
|align=right|64||align=right|24||align=right|56
||Second round
|Promoted to the 1. divisjon
|-
|2009
|1. divisjon
|align=right |12
|align=right|30||align=right|11||align=right|6||align=right|13
|align=right|38||align=right|54||align=right|39
||Second round
|
|-
|2010
|1. divisjon
|align=right bgcolor="#FFCCCC"| 14
|align=right|28||align=right|8||align=right|4||align=right|16
|align=right|33||align=right|50||align=right|28
||Third round
|Relegated to the 2. divisjon
|-
|2011 
|2. divisjon
|align=right bgcolor=#DDFFDD| 1
|align=right|26||align=right|20||align=right|2||align=right|4
|align=right|105||align=right|28||align=right|62
||Second round
|Promoted to the 1. divisjon
|-
|2012 
|1. divisjon
|align=right bgcolor="#FFCCCC"| 13
|align=right|30||align=right|10||align=right|5||align=right|15
|align=right|51||align=right|62||align=right|35
||Third round
|Relegated to the 2. divisjon
|-
|2013
|2. divisjon
|align=right bgcolor=#DDFFDD| 1
|align=right|26||align=right|19||align=right|5||align=right|2
|align=right|70||align=right|31||align=right|62
||Second round
|Promoted to the 1. divisjon
|-
|2014 
|1. divisjon
|align=right bgcolor="#FFCCCC"|14
|align=right|30||align=right|8||align=right|7||align=right|15
|align=right|44||align=right|56||align=right|31
||Fourth round
|Relegated to the 2. divisjon
|-
|2015 
|2. divisjon
|align=right |2
|align=right|26||align=right|18||align=right|3||align=right|5
|align=right|71||align=right|27||align=right|57
||Fourth round
|
|-
|2016 
|2. divisjon
|align=right bgcolor=#DDFFDD| 1
|align=right|26||align=right|21||align=right|4||align=right|1
|align=right|71||align=right|19||align=right|67
||Third round
|Promoted to the 1. divisjon
|-
|2017 
|1. divisjon
|align=right |9
|align=right|30||align=right|9||align=right|10||align=right|11
|align=right|43||align=right|43||align=right|37
||Second round
|
|-
|2018 
|1. divisjon
|align=right |7
|align=right|30||align=right|12||align=right|7||align=right|11
|align=right|43||align=right|47||align=right|43
||Second round
|
|-
|2019 
|1. divisjon
|align=right bgcolor="#FFCCCC"|16
|align=right|30||align=right|3||align=right|4||align=right|23
|align=right|36||align=right|79||align=right|13
||Fourth round
|Relegated to the 2. divisjon
|-
|2020
|2. divisjon
|align=right |7
|align=right|18||align=right|6||align=right|4||align=right|8
|align=right|31||align=right|24||align=right|22
||Cancelled
|
|-
|2021
|2. divisjon
|align=right |4
|align=right|26||align=right|13||align=right|6||align=right|7
|align=right|52||align=right|34||align=right|45
||First round
|
|-
|2022
|2. divisjon
|align=right |8
|align=right|26||align=right|10||align=right|5||align=right|11
|align=right|28||align=right|35||align=right|35
||Third round
|
|}
Source:

Current squad
As of 8 April 2021.

References

External links
Official site 

Football clubs in Norway
Athletics clubs in Norway
Sports clubs established in 1938
Association football clubs established in 1938
1938 establishments in Norway
Sport in Tromsø